is a skyscraper located in Shinjuku, Tokyo, Japan. Completed in 1996, it stands 234 metres (768 feet) high and has 54 floors. The tower is the third-tallest building in Shinjuku, Tokyo and seventh-tallest in Tokyo. The closest train station to Opera City is Hatsudai.

The building houses concert halls, an art gallery, a media-art museum (NTT InterCommunication Center) and many restaurants and shops on its lower floors. The fifth through fifty-second floors are devoted to office space.

The building is adjacent to the New National Theater, which is located in Shibuya, Tokyo. The combined complex of the tower and the theatre is called the "Tokyo Opera City".

In film
The building is seen blown up by a UFO in the 1999 Kaiju film Godzilla 2000.

Gallery

External links
 　 
 Tokyo Opera City Map
 Superhigh-Rise Buildings and Towers (Takenaka Corporation)　 

Skyscrapers in Shinjuku
Office buildings completed in 1996
Skyscraper office buildings in Tokyo
1996 establishments in Japan